Marie-Abraham Rosalbin de Buncey was a French 19th-century landscape, allegorical and figure painter.

Biography
Marie-Abraham Rosalbin de Buncey was born in 1833  in Chatillon-sur-Marne, France. He studied at the École des Beaux-Arts in Paris under Léon Cogniet. He exhibited his works at the Salon de Paris in 1879. The painter died in Paris in 1891. Marie-Abraham Rosalbin de Buncey is famous for his dark forest landscapes combined with bright clearings and bathing nude women and/or Venus in the style of Narcisse Virgilio Díaz.

Artworks in public collections
 Musée des Beaux-Arts de Chambéry : "Étude de moutons au jardin des plantes"
 Montpellier Museum : "Le Cabaret de la Glacière à Saint-Ouen"
 Pontoise Museum : "Le départ" (the departure)
 Le Puy-en-Velay (Musée Crozatier) : "Femmes nues dans un paysage" (nude in a landscape)
 Reims Museum : "Le Parc Monceau"
 Sceaux (Musée de l'Île-de-France) : "Moulin de Bagnolet près St Gervais" (drawing)

Notes

References
Benezit Dictionary of Artists in 14 volumes, Éditions Gründ, Jan 1999, 13440 p.
Joconde database Marie-Abraham Rosalbin de Buncey artworks in the French public collections.
Gérald Schurr, Valeurs de demain : Les petits Maîtres de la peinture 1820-1920 (Small masters) vol. 2, éditions de l'Amateur, Paris, 1982, 1120 p.
Sophie Monneret, L'impressionnisme et son époque: M à T, vol. 2, Denoël, 1981.

External links
Artprice Auction results of Marie-Abraham Rosalbin de Buncey's artworks .
Artnet Pictures of Rosalbin de Buncey's artworks, Artnet

1852 births
1876 deaths
19th-century French painters
French male painters
19th-century French male artists